Rodent Popsicle is an American record label, founded by Bill Damon, singer of the band Toxic Narcotic, with the help of his bandmates. Following the DIY ethic, the purpose of the label is not to pursue profits from the releases but to help bands get heard. The label has released albums by A Global Threat, Fleas and Lice,Thumbs Up!, Darkbuster, Toxic Narcotic, Mouth Sewn Shut, The Profit$, Retching Red, The Restarts, Naked Aggression, Iskra, and The Varukers.

History 
In the beginning, the label was set to release only a few records by Toxic Narcotic, but the label quickly started to grow, releasing the first 7-inch EP of the Hingham band The Unseen, titled Too Young To Know... Too Reckless To Care in 1994, this would help to get known in the Boston area. Some of the early releases included Food Chain in Your Living Room by August Spies, Populution, New Ways to Create Waste and 2 Oz. Slab of Hate by Toxic Narcotic.

At the end of the 90s the label released the compilations Another Boston Punk Comp. and Boston Punk 2000, supporting local Boston bands, and the Toxic Narcotic split albums with Whorehouse of Representatives, and The Unseen among other albums. Bands like A Poor Excuse, The Profit$, The Statistics, Shoot the Hostages, Razorwire and others released albums with Rodent Popsicle Records at that time.

By 2000 the label began to release albums from international bands, because of this, they decided to take a more serious stand, with an increasing volume of records, also the quality developed, having releases from bands such as Antidote and Fleas and Lice from Netherlands, the re-issue of the Murder LP and the Nothing's Changed EP of The Varukers in one CD, Allergic to Whores from Cleveland, Iskra from Canada, Bristle from Seattle, Naked Aggression from Los Angeles, Virulent Strain from New York City, Fabulous Disaster from San Francisco, Clusterfux from Denver, and many Boston bands, including Dead Pedestrians, A Global Threat, Tommy & The Terrors, The Epidemic, The Profit$, Mouth Sewn Shut, State Control, Mung (featuring members of The Freeze, Darkbuster, Wrecking Crew, and Avoid One Thing), Midnight Creeps, Disaster Strikes, Retching Red, Capo Regime, 26 Beers, Short Changed, and Two Man Advantage to name a few.

See also 
List of record labels

External links 
 
Videoclip for the song Asshole from the Live in Boston DVD by Toxic Narcotic

Punk record labels
American independent record labels
Record labels established in 1992